United States Treasury securities, also called Treasuries or Treasurys, are government debt instruments issued by the United States Department of the Treasury to finance government spending as an alternative to taxation. Since 2012, U.S. government debt has been managed by the Bureau of the Fiscal Service, succeeding the Bureau of the Public Debt.

There are four types of marketable Treasury securities: Treasury bills, Treasury notes, Treasury bonds, and Treasury Inflation Protected Securities (TIPS). The government sells these securities in auctions conducted by the Federal Reserve Bank of New York, after which they can be traded in secondary markets. Non-marketable securities include savings bonds, issued to the public and transferable only as gifts; the State and Local Government Series (SLGS), purchaseable only with the proceeds of state and municipal bond sales; and the Government Account Series, purchased by units of the federal government.

Treasury securities are backed by the full faith and credit of the United States, meaning that the government promises to raise money by any legally available means to repay them. Although the United States is a sovereign power and may default without recourse, its strong record of repayment has given Treasury securities a reputation as one of the world's lowest-risk investments. This low risk gives Treasuries a unique place in the financial system, where they are used as cash equivalents by institutions, corporations, and wealthy investors.

History
To finance the costs of World War I, the U.S. Government increased income taxes (see the War Revenue Act of 1917) and issued government debt, called war bonds. Traditionally, the government borrowed from other countries, but there were no other countries from which to borrow in 1917.

The Treasury raised funding throughout the war by selling $21.5 billion in 'Liberty bonds.' These bonds were sold at subscription where officials created coupon price and then sold it at par value. At this price, subscriptions could be filled in as little as one day, but usually remained open for several weeks, depending on demand for the bond.

After the war, the Liberty bonds were reaching maturity, but the Treasury was unable to pay each down fully with only limited budget surpluses. To solve this problem, the Treasury refinanced the debt with variable short and medium-term maturities. Again the Treasury issued debt through fixed-price subscription, where both the coupon and the price of the debt were dictated by the Treasury.

The problems with debt issuance became apparent in the late 1920s. The system suffered from chronic over-subscription, where interest rates were so attractive that there were more purchasers of debt than required by the government. This indicated that the government was paying too much for debt. As government debt was undervalued, debt purchasers could buy from the government and immediately sell to another market participant at a higher price.

In 1929, the US Treasury shifted from the fixed-price subscription system to a system of auctioning where Treasury bills would be sold to the highest bidder. Securities were then issued on a pro rata system where securities would be allocated to the highest bidder until their demand was full. If more treasuries were supplied by the government, they would then be allocated to the next highest bidder. This system allowed the market, rather than the government, to set the price. On December 10, 1929, the Treasury issued its first auction. The result was the issuing of $224 million three-month bills. The highest bid was at 99.310 with the lowest bid accepted at 99.152.

Until the 1970s, the Treasury offered long-term securities at irregular intervals based on market surveys. These irregular offerings created uncertainty in the money market, especially as the federal deficit increased, and by the end of the decade the Treasury had shifted to regular and predictable offerings. During the same period, the Treasury began to offer notes and bonds through an auction process based on that used for bills.

Marketable securities

The types and procedures for marketable security issues are described in the Treasury's Uniform Offering Circular (31 CFR 356).

Treasury bill

Treasury bills (T-bills) are zero-coupon bonds that mature in one year or less. They are bought at a discount of the par value and, instead of paying a coupon interest, are eventually redeemed at that par value to create a positive yield to maturity.

Regular T-bills are commonly issued with maturity dates of 4, 8, 13, 17, 26 and 52 weeks, each of these approximating a different number of months. Treasury bills are sold by single-price auctions held weekly. Offering amounts for 13-week and 26-week bills are announced each Thursday for auction on the following Monday and settlement, or issuance, on Thursday. Offering amounts for 4-week and 8-week bills are announced on Monday for auction the next day, Tuesday, and issuance on Thursday. Offering amounts for 52-week bills are announced every fourth Thursday for auction the next Tuesday, and issuance on the following Thursday. The minimum purchase is $100; it had been $1,000 prior to April 2008. Mature T-bills are also redeemed on each Thursday. Banks and financial institutions, especially primary dealers, are the largest purchasers of T-bills.

Like other securities, individual issues of T-bills are identified with a unique CUSIP number. The 13-week bill issued three months after a 26-week bill is considered a re-opening of the 26-week bill and is given the same CUSIP number. The 4-week bill issued two months after that and maturing on the same day is also considered a re-opening of the 26-week bill and shares the same CUSIP number. For example, the 26-week bill issued on March 22, 2007, and maturing on September 20, 2007, has the same CUSIP number (912795A27) as the 13-week bill issued on June 21, 2007, and maturing on September 20, 2007, and as the 4-week bill issued on August 23, 2007, that matures on September 20, 2007.

During periods when Treasury cash balances are particularly low, the Treasury may sell cash management bills (CMBs). These are sold through a discount auction process like regular bills, but are irregular in the amount offered, the timing, and the maturity term. CMBs are referred to as "on-cycle" when they mature on the same day as a regular bill issue, and "off-cycle" otherwise. Before the introduction of the four-week bill in 2001, the Treasury sold CMBs routinely to ensure short-term cash availability. CMB offerings then all but disappeared aside from occasional auction system tests until the COVID-19 pandemic, when the Treasury used them extensively to reinforce its cash position amid fiscal uncertainty.

Treasury bills are quoted for purchase and sale in the secondary market on an annualized discount percentage, or basis. General calculation for the discount yield for Treasury bills is:

Treasury note

Treasury notes (T-notes) have maturities of 2, 3, 5, 7, or 10 years, have a coupon payment every six months, and are sold in increments of $100. T-note prices are quoted on the secondary market as a percentage of the par value in thirty-seconds of a dollar. Ordinary Treasury notes pay a fixed interest rate that is set at auction. Current yields on the 10-year Treasury note are widely followed by investors and the public to monitor the performance of the U.S. government bond market and as a proxy for investor expectations of longer-term macroeconomic conditions.

Another type of Treasury note, known as the floating rate note, pays interest quarterly based on rates set in periodic auctions of 13-week Treasury bills. As with a conventional fixed-rate instrument, holders are paid the par value of the note when it matures at the end of the two-year term.

Treasury bond

Treasury bonds (T-bonds, also called a long bond) have the longest maturity at twenty or thirty years. They have a coupon payment every six months like T-notes.

The U.S. federal government suspended issuing 30-year Treasury bonds for four years from February 18, 2002, to February 9, 2006. As the U.S. government used budget surpluses to pay down federal debt in the late 1990s, the 10-year Treasury note began to replace the 30-year Treasury bond as the general, most-followed metric of the U.S. bond market. However, because of demand from pension funds and large, long-term institutional investors, along with a need to diversify the Treasury's liabilities—and also because the flatter yield curve meant that the opportunity cost of selling long-dated debt had dropped—the 30-year Treasury bond was re-introduced in February 2006 and is now issued quarterly. In 2019, Treasury Secretary Steven Mnuchin said that the Trump administration was considering issuance of 50-year and even 100-year Treasury bonds, a suggestion which did not materialize.

TIPS
Treasury Inflation-Protected Securities (TIPS) are inflation-indexed bonds issued by the U.S. Treasury. Introduced in 1997, they are currently offered in 5-year, 10-year and 30-year maturities. The coupon rate is fixed at the time of issuance, but the principal is adjusted periodically based on changes in the Consumer Price Index (CPI), the most commonly used measure of inflation. When the CPI rises, the principal is adjusted upward; if the index falls, the principal is adjusted downwards. The adjustments to the principal increase interest income when the CPI rises, thus protecting the holder's purchasing power. This "virtually guarantees" a real return over and above the rate of inflation, according to finance scholar Dr. Annette Thau.

Finance scholars Martinelli, Priaulet and Priaulet state that inflation-indexed securities in general (including those used in the United Kingdom and France) provide efficient instruments to diversify portfolios and manage risk because they have a weak correlation with stocks, fixed-coupon bonds and cash equivalents.

A 2014 study found that conventional U.S. Treasury bonds were persistently mispriced relative to TIPS, creating arbitrage opportunities and posing "a major puzzle to classical asset pricing theory."

Coupon stripping
The secondary market for securities includes T-notes, T-bonds, and TIPS whose interest and principal portions of the security have been separated, or "stripped", in order to sell them separately. The practice derives from the days before computerization, when treasury securities were issued as paper bearer bonds; traders would literally separate the interest coupons from paper securities for separate resale, while the principal would be resold as a zero-coupon bond.

The modern versions are known as Separate Trading of Registered Interest and Principal Securities (STRIPS). The Treasury does not directly issue STRIPS – they are products of investment banks or brokerage firms – but it does register STRIPS in its book-entry system. STRIPS must be purchased through a broker, and cannot be purchased from TreasuryDirect.

Nonmarketable securities

U.S. savings bonds

Savings bonds were created in 1935, and, in the form of Series E bonds, also known as war bonds, were widely sold to finance World War II. Unlike Treasury Bonds, they are not marketable, being redeemable only by the original purchaser (or beneficiary in case of death). They remained popular after the end of WWII, often used for personal savings and given as gifts. In 2002, the Treasury Department started changing the savings bond program by lowering interest rates and closing its marketing offices. As of January 1, 2012, financial institutions no longer sell paper savings bonds.

Savings bonds are currently offered in two forms, Series EE and Series I bonds. Series EE bonds pay a fixed rate but are guaranteed to pay at least double the purchase price when they reach initial maturity at 20 years; if the compounded interest has not resulted in a doubling of the initial purchase amount, the Treasury makes a one-time adjustment at 20 years to make up the difference. They continue to pay interest until 30 years.

Series I bonds have a variable interest rate that consists of two components. The first is a fixed rate which will remain constant over the life of the bond; the second component is a variable rate reset every six months from the time the bond is purchased based on the current inflation rate as measured by the Consumer Price Index for urban consumers (CPI-U) from a six-month period ending one month prior to the reset time. New rates are published on May 1 and November 1 of every year. During times of deflation the negative inflation rate can wipe out the return of the fixed portion, but the combined rate cannot go below 0% and the bond will not lose value. Series I bonds are the only ones offered as paper bonds since 2011, and those may only be purchased by using a portion of a federal income tax refund.

Zero-Percent Certificate of Indebtedness
The "Certificate of Indebtedness" (C of I) is issued only through the TreasuryDirect system. It is an automatically renewed security with one-day maturity that can be purchased in any amount up to $1000, and does not earn interest. An investor can use Certificates of Indebtedness to save funds in a TreasuryDirect account for the purchase of an interest-bearing security.

Government Account Series
The Government Account Series is the principal form of intragovernmental debt holdings. The government issues GAS securities to federal departments and federally-established entities like the Federal Deposit Insurance Corporation that have excess cash.

State and Local Government Series
The State and Local Government Series (SLGS) is issued to government entities below the federal level which have excess cash that was obtained through the sale of tax-exempt bonds. The federal tax code generally forbids investment of this cash in securities that offer a higher yield than the original bond, but SLGS securities are exempt from this restriction. The Treasury issues SLGS securities at its discretion and has suspended sales on several occasions to adhere to the federal debt ceiling.

Holdings

Domestic
In June 2022 approximately $23 trillion of outstanding Treasury securities, representing 75% of the public debt, belonged to domestic holders. Of this amount $6 trillion or 20% of the debt was held by agencies of the federal government itself. These intragovernmental holdings function as time deposits of the agencies' excess and reserve funds to the Treasury. The Federal Reserve Bank of New York was also a significant holder as the market agent of the Federal Reserve system, with $6.2 trillion or roughly 20%. Other domestic holders included mutual funds ($2.8 trillion), state and local governments ($1.9 trillion), banks ($1.8 trillion), private pension funds ($768 billion), insurers ($368 billion) and assorted private entities and individuals ($3 trillion, including $160 billion in Savings Bonds).

International

As of June 30, 2021, the top foreign holders of U.S. Treasury securities are:

{| class=wikitable
! Debt holder
! Total
! % change
! % held as
|-
|
|
|
|
|-
|
|
|
|
|-
|
|
|
|
|-
|
|
|
|
|-
|
|
|
|
|-
|
|
|
|
|-
|
|
|
|
|-
|
|
|
|
|-
|
|
|
|
|-
|
|
|
|
|-
|
|
|
|
|-
|
|
|
|
|-
|
|
|
|
|-
|
|
|
|
|-
|
|
|
|
|-
|
|
|
|
|-
|
|
|
|
|-
|
|
|
|
|-
|others
|
|
|
|-
!Total
!7,502.1
!+ 6%'!
|}

See also

 Chiasso financial smuggling case
 Consol
 Government debt
 Interest
 Inverted yield curve
 Risk
 Strong dollar policy
 War bond
 War savings stamps

References

 Further reading 
Sarah L. Quinn. 2019. American Bonds: How Credit Markets Shaped a Nation''. Princeton University Press.

External links 

 Bureau of the Public Debt: US Savings Bonds Online
 Major Foreign Holders of U.S. Treasury Bonds
 U.S. Bureau of the Public Debt: Series A, B, C, D, E, F, G, H, J, and K Savings Bonds and Savings Notes.
 Features and Risks of Treasury Inflation Protection Securities
 U.S. Treasury Resource Center – Treasury International Capital (TIC) System
 10 Year Treasury Yield Chart
 US Treasuries – Key Rates, Prices, Yields, Durations

Securities
Government finances in the United States
Government bonds issued by the United States
Interest-bearing instruments
Money market instruments